Walloomsac may refer to:

Walloomsac, New York, a location in New York State
Walloomsac River, a tributary of the Hoosic River